Ben Guerir is a university town and military town that serves as the capital of Rehamna Province in central Morocco, in the Marrakesh-Safi region. it hosts Mohammed VI Polytechnic University and Ben Guerir Air Base. The city is known for the production of phosphate rock, OCP Group announced plans to make Ben Guerir into a green city.
According to the 2014 Moroccan census Ben Guerir has a population of 88,626 inhabitants, up from 62,693 in 2004., The city is in the territory of the Rahamna tribe.

See also
Ben Guerir Air Base

References

Populated places in Rehamna Province
Municipalities of Morocco
Ben Guerir